In the temporal bone, in the portion beneath the falciform crest are three sets of foramina; one group, just below the posterior part of the crest, situated in the area cribrosa media, consists of several small openings for the nerves to the saccule; below and behind this area is the foramen singulare, or opening for the nerve to the posterior semicircular canal.

References 

Human anatomy